Playlist: The Very Best of Carly Simon is the fifth greatest hits album by American singer-songwriter Carly Simon, released on October 27, 2014.

A part of Sony BMG's Playlist compilation albums series, it contains selected tracks from the albums Spoiled Girl (1985), Coming Around Again (1987), Working Girl: Original Soundtrack Album (1989), Have You Seen Me Lately (1990), and The Bedroom Tapes (2000). All live recordings are from Simon's 1988 live album Greatest Hits Live, with the exception of "Touched By The Sun", which is from 1995's Live at Grand Central.

Reception

AllMusic, commenting that the collection "focuses on the pop legend's mid-to late-period output", wrote "Simon fans looking for music from this specific period will find much to love here, while listeners looking for something a little more comprehensive would be better off with something like 1998's career spanning The Very Best of Carly Simon: Nobody Does It Better, or 2004's like-minded Reflections: Carly Simon's Greatest Hits."

Track listing
Credits adapted from the album's liner notes.

Credits

References

External links
 Carly Simon's Official Website

Carly Simon compilation albums
2014 compilation albums
Simon, Carly